The 1978 Belgian International Championships was a men's tennis tournament staged at the Leopold Club in Brussels, Belgium that was part of the Grand Prix circuit. The tournament was played on outdoor clay courts and was held from 12 June until 18 June 1978. It was the seventh edition of the tournament and unseeded Werner Zirngibl, who entered the competition as a qualifier, won the singles title.

Finals

Singles
 Werner Zirngibl defeated  Ricardo Cano 1–6, 6–3, 6–4, 6–3
 It was Zirngib's only singles title of his career.

Doubles
 Antonio Zugarelli /  Jean-Louis Haillet defeated  Onny Parun /  Vladimír Zedník 6–3, 4–6, 7–5

References

Belgian International Championships
Belgian International Championships
Belgian International Championships, 1978